A municipal airport is an airport owned by a city or municipality. It may refer to:

 Municipal Airport (Missouri), Unionville, Missouri, United States (FAA: K43)
 Municipal Airport (Oklahoma), Texhoma, Oklahoma, United States (FAA: K49)
 Municipal Airport, San Bernardino, former name of Norton Air Force Base

See also
 Covington Municipal Airport (disambiguation)